Gazikentspor Women's Football Club is a women's football club based in Gaziantep, Turkey. Founded in 2006, the club is located in the Gazikent neighborhood of Şehitkamil district. The team manager is Cesim Karalar. The club's colors are red, green and white. The team play their home matches in the Gazikent Stadium within the Gazikent Sports Complex.

After defeating the Ankara-based Fomget Gençlik Spor in the second leg of the Women's Second League play-off match, the team was promoted to play in the 2014–15 season of Turkish Women's First Football League.

After playing two seasons in the First League, the team were relegated to the Second League.

Stadium 
Gazikentspor play their home matches at Batur Stadium in Gaziantep.

Statistics 
.

(1): Seasin in progress
(2): Three points deducted due to no show-up in one match
(3): Fınished Group 2 on the last place, remained in the Second League aufter playouts
(4): Season discontinued due to COVID-19 pandemic in Turkey
(5): Fınished Group A on the third place, lost the play-off match to get promoted

Current squad 

.

Head coach:  Casim Karalar

Kit history

References 

Women's football clubs in Turkey
Sport in Gaziantep
2006 establishments in Turkey
Association football clubs established in 2006
Şehitkamil District